Chernyanka is an urban locality (a settlement) and the administrative center of Chernyansky District of Belgorod Oblast, Russia, located along the Oskol River. Population: 

It was first mentioned in 1656.

References

Urban-type settlements in Belgorod Oblast
Populated places in Chernyansky District
Novooskolsky Uyezd